Corruption in Mexico has permeated several segments of society – political, economic, and social – and has greatly affected the country's legitimacy, transparency, accountability, and effectiveness. Many of these dimensions have evolved as a product of Mexico's legacy of elite, oligarchic consolidation of power and authoritarian rule.

Transparency International's 2021 Corruption Perceptions Index ranks the country 124th place out of 180 countries.

PRI rule 

Although the Institutional Revolutionary Party (PRI) came to power through cooptation and peace, it maintained power for 71 years straight (1929 to 2000) by establishing patronage networks and relying on personalistic measures. That is why, Mexico functioned as a one-party state and was characterized by a system in which politicians provided bribes to their constituents in exchange for support and votes for reelection. This type of clientelism constructed a platform through which political corruption had the opportunity to flourish: little political competition and organization outside of the party existed; it was not possible to independently contest the PRI system. Political contestation equated to political, economic, and social isolation and neglect.  The party remained securely in power, and government accountability was low.

Hierarchization was the norm. Power was consolidated in the hands of an elite few, and even more narrowly, the president controlled almost all of the practical power across the three branches of government. This central figure had both the formal and informal power to exercise extralegal authority over the judiciary and legislature and to relegate these other branches to the executive's individual political will.

Beyond this, few checks were set on elected officials’ actions throughout the PRI's unbroken reign. Consequently, sustained PRI rule yielded low levels of transparency and legitimacy within the councils of Mexico's government. 71 years of power provided an opportunity for corruption to accumulate and become increasingly complex.  Civil society developed around economic interest aggregation that was organized by the clientelistic government; the PRI allowed citizens to collectively bargain under the condition that they would continue to provide political loyalty to the party. Anthony Kruszewski, Tony Payan, and Katheen Staudt explain, 

With this type of institutionalized corruption, the political path in Mexico was very narrow. There were specified political participation channels (the party) and selective electoral mobilization (party members). These issues, deeply engrained in Mexico's political culture after over half a century's existence, have continued to generate and institutionalize political corruption in today's Mexico.

Organized crime

Border issues

Mexico’s geographic location has played largely in the development of the country’s role in organized crime and drug trafficking. Not only is Mexico adjacent to the world’s largest illegal drug market – the United States – but it also borders Central and South America, the latter being a region of nations with a similarly high demand for drugs. This positions Mexican drug cartels at an advantage; demand for drugs is not simply confined to the Mexican state, but rather it extends to several other nearby countries. Because of this, Mexico’s borders are especially crucial to drug cartels and transnational criminal organizations (TCOs), which can exploit the borders as a passageway for contraband and as a method for consolidation of power.

As drug cartels and TCOs have increasingly made use of these areas, the groups have become progressively more complex, violent, and diverse. Trafficking has been accompanied by other forms of illegal activity – such as extortion, kidnappings, and political corruption – as disparate factions compete for control over the same, lucrative areas.

The Mexican government has historically accomplished very little in terms of effectively curbing the offenses of these TCOs and cartels, and has often actually been complicit in aiding their actions. Many of Mexico’s institutions – including those for law, policy, justice, and finance – function under a patron-client system in which officials receive money, political support, or other bribes from TCOs in exchange for minimal interference in, or impunity for, those criminal groups’ affairs. In these scenarios of narco-corruption, Mexico's power structure is defined by leaders who guide TCOs’ behaviors, receive payoffs, manipulate government resources, and align public policies with legislation that will further their personal and political objectives. These relationships have served as an impetus for new and problematic sources of violent, drug-related deaths, ineffective governance and policy implementation, terror-based TCO tactics, and a deepening drug market. Under this system, TCOs’ influence has extended beyond violent criminal activity or drug trade, and has reached into Mexico's institutional bases.

These networks – alongside a lack of government transparency and checks and balances – have allowed corruption in government to flourish.

Transition to PAN rule

The growing prevalence and diversification of organized crime is in many ways linked to the political changes that Mexico underwent in 2000. For the first time in 71 years, the PRI ceded power to a different party, the National Action Party (Mexico) (PAN). The traditional power structure, which had enabled patronage networks to flourish and TCOs to operate, became challenged by government forces that attempted to curb violence and illegal activity.

However, social decomposition quickly followed the fall of the PRI. The PAN, never before in the seat of power, was in many ways inexperienced in broad governance, and criminal factions capitalized on the party's perceived weakness. New conflicts emerged among cartels, as different groups competed to further develop their criminal networks and to work against a political regime that struggled to fight corruption, establish legitimacy, and foster legislative effectiveness.

Calderón administration

During PAN President Felipe Calderón's administration, Mexico experienced a vast increase in organized crime. Anthony Kruszewski, Tony Payan, and Katheen Staudt note, 

In this, beyond further diversifying criminal activity, TCOs further developed their connections to Mexico's institutions and to corruption. Many members of the Federal Police and the Army joined TCOs, and participated in abuses against the citizenry. This corruption permeated the social atmosphere along the border, where violence became increasingly heightened and fatal.
Attempting to combat this security crisis, Calderón deployed the military against criminal organizations along the border. However, rather than resolving the corruption and violence issues that pervaded the area, the army deepened problems and crime. Citizens claimed that armed soldiers, connected to TCOs through their own patronage networks, initiated abuses against the population, including illegal searches, unwarranted arrests, beatings, theft, rape, and torture.

The employment of the military by the Calderón administration exacerbated Mexico's violence and organized crime, adding human rights violations to the border's climate of lawlessness. Anthony Kruszewski, Tony Payan, and Katheen Staudt examine, The arrival of the military corresponded with institutional disintegration as the corruption of elected officials, soldiers, and police demonstrated the entrenched culture of dishonesty and illegality of Mexico's systems.

To redact the negative products of militia employment, Calderón changed his policy strategy to one of reconstruction – rebuilding the Federal Police to have an increase in technical and operational activities, to have more comprehensive offices and departments, and to have a more selective personnel recruitment process. These measures reduced some of the corruption that had been embedded under his administration, but still left many realms of Mexico in the clutches of institutional corruption.

Peña Nieto administration

Following Calderón's administration, the PRI returned to power under President Enrique Peña Nieto. Although new hopes for a more safe and secure Mexico accompanied the change in office, residual problems from the previous administrations continued to pervade the country. TCO violence remained high, local clientelism persisted, and the drug market continued to be profitable.  With these issues still highly prominent and supported by corruption, the administration struggled to establish legitimacy and accountability within the councils of governance.

These issues of legitimacy became even more defined in 2014, when Peña Nieto became entangled in numerous corruption scandals. In the most prominent and controversial case, Peña Nieto, his wife Angélica Rivera, and his Finance Minister Luis Videgaray were criticized for purchasing multimillion-dollar houses from government contractors. Allegations of vast impropriety surrounded the deal, and citizens began to question the veracity and legitimacy of Peña Nieto's government. Moreover, when an investigation into these allegations was launched, Public Function Ministry head Virgilio Andrade – a close personal friend of President Peña Nieto – was put in charge, and many Mexicans cited the investigation as a conflict of interest in which "the executive branch investigated itself."

This scandal brought about another controversy when investigative journalist Carmen Aristegui and two colleagues from MVS Radio were fired following their reports on the housing scandal. Their dismissal prompted protests and criticism, alongside a new dialogue of the Peña Nieto administration's use of “soft censorship”:  

As of August 2016, only 23% of Mexicans approved of how Peña Nieto was dealing with corruption. by January 2017, the number had decreased to 12%.

Media 
Among the institutions organized crime pervaded and manipulated were the media. Many TCOs violently attacked media sources that reported stories of the gangs’, cartels’, and military's abuses and relationships with political elites. Consequently, many news organizations simply stopped publishing stories about the crimes. Freedom of expression and speech were increasingly limited as the media experienced violent disputes. Outside of TCOs, state apparatuses also worked to keep negative stories under wraps. Guadalupe Correa-Cabrera and José Nava explain: 
Compared to other Latin American countries, Mexico has the lowest rating for freedom of the press  – press freedom watch groups have found that the country is one of the most dangerous in the world to be a professional journalist. The international human rights group Article 19 found that in 2014 alone, more than 325 journalists experienced aggressive action by government officials and organized crime, and five reporters were killed due to their line of work. Furthermore, according to the Committee to Protect Journalists, since 2005, at least 32 journalists have been killed because of their profession in Mexico.

See also 
 Institutional Revolutionary Party
 Crime in Mexico
The Demons of Eden
 Organized crime
 Mexico
 Police corruption in Mexico
 International Anti-Corruption Academy
 Group of States Against Corruption
 International Anti-Corruption Day
 ISO 37001 Anti-bribery management systems
 United Nations Convention against Corruption
 OECD Anti-Bribery Convention
 Transparency International

References

External links
Mexico Corruption Profile from the Business Anti-Corruption Portal

 
Crime in Mexico by type
Society of Mexico
Politics of Mexico
Mexico articles needing expert attention
Mexico